Paul Phillipps Harrison (December 1, 1882 – October 22, 1950) was a Canadian politician. He served in the Legislative Assembly of British Columbia from 1924 to 1928 from the electoral district of Comox, an independent Liberal member.

References

1882 births
1950 deaths